Shklow District (Shklovsky raion) is a raion (district) in Mogilev Region, Belarus, the administrative center is the town of Shklow. As of 2009, its population was 30,802. Population of Shklow accounts for 53.4% of the district's population.

References

 
Districts of Mogilev Region